Donell Rush (1960 – March 22, 1996) was an American R&B singer, who was signed to RCA Records in the 1990s. He scored a Top 10 hit in the US Billboard Hot Dance Club Play chart with the song "Symphony", from his debut album, Comin' & Goin. "Symphony" peaked at No. 66 in the UK Singles Chart in December 1992. He scored another minor hit with "Let's Get Intimate" featuring Chantay Savage in 1992.

Rush died suddenly on March 22, 1996, of pulmonary embolism just months shy of his 36th birthday. His last recording "Shout N Out" with Lood was recorded 6 days before his death.

References

American rhythm and blues singers
1996 deaths
1960 births
20th-century American singers
Deaths from pulmonary embolism